Isiolo–Mandera Road, is a road in Kenya. It is a major transport route linking north-central Kenya to Kenya's northeast. The counties that the road traverses are generally arid, 
and have hitherto been undeserved. This road project is the largest and most expensive infrastructure project in northeastern Kenya since the country became independent in 1963.

Location
The road traverses Isiolo County, Wajir County and Mandera County.

Overview
This major transport corridor has been in poor physical condition, since Kenya became independent in 1963. The government of Kenya, with financial backing by the World Bank, plans to upgrade the gravel-surface road to class II bitumen standard, with culverts and drainage channels. As of February 2020, the Kenya National Highways Authority (KeNHA), has divided the road into nine sections, each to be tendered separately. It is estimated that the entire  project, will cost in excess of KSh85 billion (approx. US$856 million).

Intersections
These are the major intersections along this road: The Lamu–Garissa–Isiolo Road at Mado Gashi. Intersections with planned roads include the Isiolo-Lokichar Road at Isiolo and the Isiolo-Moyale Road also at Isiolo.

Funding
In September 2020, the World Bank lent KSh81.3 billion (US$756.3 million) to the government of Kenya towards the tarmacking of this road to class II bitumen standard, with culverts, drainage channels and shoulders. The remaining  will be tarmacked with funding from other development partners.

See also
Trans-African Highway network
List of roads in Kenya

References

External links
Taking A Walk Through The ‘Big Snake’ As of 20 June 2013.

Roads in Kenya
Isiolo County
Wajir County
Mandera County